Patients is a 2016 French drama directed by Grand Corps Malade and Mehdi Idir.

Plot
Following a serious sports accident in a swimming pool, Ben, now an incomplete quadriplegic, arrives in a rehabilitation center. He meets other disabled people (tetraplegics, paraplegics, traumatized crania), all victims of accidents, as well as a disabled since his early childhood. Between impotence, despair and resignation, in the daily struggle to learn to move a finger or to hold a fork, some slowly find a little mobility while others receive the verdict of the disability for life. Despite everything, hope and friendship help them endure their difficulties.

Cast

 Pablo Pauly as Ben
 Soufiane Guerrab as Farid
 Moussa Mansaly as Toussaint
 Nailia Harzoune as Samia
 Franck Falise as Steve
 Yannick Renier as François
 Jason Divengele as Lamine
 Rabah Nait Oufella as Eddy
 Dominique Blanc as Dr. Challes
 Alban Ivanov as Jean-Marie
 Anne Benoît as Christiane
 Côme Levin as Eric
 Samir El Bidadi as Samir
 Tarik Derradji as Mamadou
 Eric Wagner as Max
 Saïd Yosri as Saïd 
 Jibril Bentchakal as Djibril
 Adama Bathily as Adama
 Corentin Fila as Basketball player

References

External links
 

2016 films
2016 drama films
French drama films
2010s French-language films
Films set in France
2010s French films